Benjamin Brewster may refer to:

Benjamin Brewster (bishop) (1860–1941), Bishop of the Episcopal Diocese of Maine, USA
Benjamin H. Brewster (1816–1888), United States Attorney General, 1881–1885
Benjamin Brewster (financier) (1828–1897), original stockholder in Standard Oil
Ben Brewster (born 1948), retired American soccer player
Ben Brewster (soccer, born 1992), American soccer player for San Francisco City FC